Kim Ho-jin (born May 5, 1970) is a South Korean actor and food show host. Kim has played leading roles in the television dramas Tender Hearts (2001), Sunshine Hunting (2002), Yellow Handkerchief (2003), New Wise Mother, Good Wife (also known as Modern Housewives, 2007), Two Wives (2009), Can't Live Without You (2012), and Everybody Say Kimchi (2014).

He married actress Kim Ji-ho on December 11, 2001 at the Millennium Seoul Hilton Hotel. Their daughter was born on April 8, 2004. The couple met while shooting More Than Love in 2000.

Filmography

Television series

Film

Variety show

Awards and nominations

References

External links
 
 
 

1970 births
Living people
South Korean male television actors
South Korean male film actors
Seoul Institute of the Arts alumni
Sejong University alumni
Chung-Ang University alumni